Spounavirinae is a subfamily of viruses in the order Caudovirales, in the family Herelleviridae. Bacteria serve as natural hosts. There are currently five species in this subfamily, divided among 2 genera.

Taxonomy
Group: dsDNA

Structure
Viruses in the subfamily Spounavirinae are non-enveloped, with icosahedral and  Head-tail geometries, and T=16 symmetry. The diameter is around 84-94 nm, with a length of 140-219 in length, contractile with globular structures at its tip, has 6 long terminal fibers, 6 short spikes and a double base platenm. Genomes are circular, around 130-160kb in length. The genome codes for 190 to 230	 proteins.

Life cycle
Viral replication is cytoplasmic. Entry into the host cell is achieved by adsorption into the host cell. DNA-templated transcription is the method of transcription. Bacteria serve as the natural host. Transmission routes are passive diffusion.

References

External links
 ICTV Report: Herelleviridae
 Viralzone: Spounavirinae

 
Virus subfamilies